The Kawasaki KLR650 is a  dual-sport motorcycle intended for both on-road and off-road riding. It was a long-standing model in Kawasaki's lineup, having been introduced in 1987 to replace the  1984–1986 Kawasaki KLR600, and remaining almost unchanged through the 2007 model. The 2008 model was the first significant redesign of the KLR650 since its inception. It was built with a 652 cc four-stroke, DOHC, dual-counterbalanced, single-cylinder, water-cooled engine. The second significant redesign in 2022 added new features such as electronic fuel injection and an anti-lock braking system.

The KLR is widely used as an inexpensive adventure/touring bike. The addition of luggage and personalized modifications (GPS, heated handgrips, larger windscreens) make it more functional on long trips. The bikes have been used for long distance and intercontinental trips, as well as full global circumnavigation rides e.g., by Dr. Gregory Frazier in 2001 and 2002.

Models
Generation 1 (1987-2007)

 KLR650-A: The "A" model was introduced in 1987, based on its KLR600 predecessor (1984 to 1986). The "A" model remained nearly unchanged until the introduction of the 2008 model in USA, Canada, Australia and South Africa. It is not sold in Europe due to emission regulations.
 KLR650-B or Tengai: The Tengai got Adventure/Dakar styling, a full fairing blending into the tank, different sidepanels, and an unsprung front mudguard. It was sold in the US starting 1990 and in other countries for two years afterward - this could be classified as a separate model in its own right as the others are more trail bike orientated. Its name "Tengai" is a traditional Japanese saying which means "The End of The Sky."
 KLR650-C: The "C" model gets completely new bodywork and is a more dirt-oriented motorcycle fitted with stiffer  front forks, improved brakes, tubular engine guard, smaller  fuel tank, and steel wheel rims. Lacking a temperature gauge, it has an over-heat lamp.
The U.S. Military has KLR650s modified by Hayes Diversified Technologies to burn military-spec fuels including diesel. (M1030M1) All-new engines were designed to replace the 4-stroke gasoline engines. The new engines employ the original unit-construction main cases and transmission, but with new piston, cylinder, and other components. The balancing system that is used in the gasoline KLR650 engines (to reduce engine vibration) was removed from the military diesel KLR engines. Some components of the military diesel version can be applied to "civilian" KLR650 models, such as the nonspillable absorbed glass mat battery which offers several advantages over the conventional unsealed KLR batteries.

Generation 2 (2008-2018)

KLR650-E: 2008 was the second major redesign of the KLR650. The changes include upgraded  forks, a new D-section swingarm, dual beam headlight, dual-piston front and rear brake calipers, upgraded cooling system, 4 mm spokes, cowling and fairing redesign as well as various redesigned parts.

Generation 3 (2022-current)
 Redesigned and unveiled on January 26, 2021, the third generation KLR brings EFI and ABS to the lineup. 

Specifications

2008 redesign 

In 2008 the KLR650 was redesigned with new aesthetics, and larger displacement  single-cylinder engine.

Changes over the years

Aside from livery/colors, the 1st Generation KLR650 did not change much between its 1987 introduction and the 2008 redesign.  The key differences are:

 1987: Crankshaft is unique to this year.
 1988: Beefed up the engine cases with extra bolts between the crank and countershaft; crank has a different part number, and may be lighter.
 1990: Countershaft improved with longer splines for increased engagement with sprocket.
 1992: Changes to front brake master cylinder.
 Mid-1996: Changed valve cover, added bracket to hold cam chain bumper; changed crank to heavier unit; improved clutch basket with 1 more clutch plate; changed countershaft sprocket retainer from slotted plate to large nut; changed second and third gear ratios.  Kickstarter no longer fits with new clutch basket. At least some early 1996 models had the matte black engine cases and covers rather than the later hammer-finished dark gray coloration found in the 1997 and later models.
 2001: Around this time final assembly moved from Japan to Thailand. All major parts still made in Japan.
 2007: New shift lever

The 2nd Generation KLR650 also did not change much between 2008 and being discontinued in 2018:

Stator "alternator" upgraded to 17 A output, providing an additional 36 watt capacity.
 2009: New piston rings are thinner and have more tension, resulting in a significant reduction in oil consumption.
 Mid-2011: New clutch basket with only 6 clutch plates (vs 7 since 1996). The change starts at engine number KL650AEA72320.
 2014 1/2: (Mid year) The 41mm forks were upgraded to make the springs 40% firmer and to increase the firmness of the rebound damping by 27%. The Uni-Trak rear linkage suspension were upgraded to provide a 63% increase spring rate and to increase the firmness of the rebound damping by 83%. Changes to the seat were made to make it narrower with a more tapered front. The width of the rear of the seat has been increased and has become less tapered.
 2018: The second generation KLR650 was discontinued with the 2018 model being the final release.

 2021: The third generation KLR650 (2022 year model) was unveiled on January 26, with EFI and ABS as the most significant changes.

References

External links

MotorcycleUSA 2008 KLR650 Review
KLR650 on Kawasaki's website
KLR650 vs. DR650 Comparison
RIDER Magazine 2008 KLR650 Review
Motorcycle Daily reviews the 2008 KLR650
2002 KLR650 Review in Minnesota Motorcycle Monthly
2008 Kawasaki KLR 650 review on the Canadian Motorcycle Guide
Hayes Diversified Technologies is building the M103M1 for the United States Marine Corps in volume. According to an article in the New York Times Feb. 24, '08, this is a heavily modified Kawasaki KLR650 with a five-speed gearbox and a top speed of more than 90 mph. It gets 96 mpg at a steady speed of 55 mph.

KLR650
Dual-sport motorcycles
Motorcycles introduced in 1987